Mohammad Najibar Rahman (1860 - October 18, 1923) was a Bengali writer of fiction from the nineteenth century. He gained great popularity as a novelist during his times and was honored with the title "Sahityaratna" (Literary Jewel). He is considered as a representative of Bengali Muslim writers of the era and is most known for his novel Anwara (1914).

Early life 
Rahman was born in 1860 in Charbeltail village, Shahjadpur Upazila, Sirajganj District. He studied at Normal school in Dhaka.

Career 
After school, Rahman worked at a Neel Kuthi (Indigo factory) in Jalpaiguri. He was a postmaster briefly. But, mostly, he served as a teacher all through his life at different schools like Bhangabari Middle English School in Sirajganj, Salanga Minor School, and Rajshahi Junior Madrasa. He was a home-tutor of the young Mahmuda Khatun Siddiqua, who later became a writer and poet.

During Rahman's tenure as a teacher in Salanga, he played a key role in the protest that lead to the withdrawal of the local Hindu Zamindar's ban on eating beef. In 1892, Rahman founded a Maktab in his village, which later was converted to a girls' school. He and his wife had to go door to door to get students for their girls school. His 1904 book, Bilati Borjon Rohoshya, was banned by the British Raj.

Prominent Muslim Bengali author Ismail Hossain Siraji inspired him to get involved in literary activities. He felt the oppression of Bengali Muslims by British Indian administrators in the context of Bengal Partition in 1905. Inspired by the notion of a free nation during this time, he published his first collection of essays in the book named Bilati Barjan Rahasya(1904). In 1905, he joined the meeting of East Bengal's Muslim leaders presided by Nawab Khwaja Salimullah.

Death 
On 18 October 1923, Rahman passed away at Hati Qumrul village in Raiganj.

Literary work 
Najibar Rahman wrote about 20 novels. His first novel Anwara(1914) made him a well-known author. His novels sketches the lives of rural Muslim families that had little representation in the Bengali literature of the time. 

Some of his literary work are listed below.

Novels:

 Anwara (1914)
 Premer Samadhi (1915)
 Chandtara (1917)
 Parinam (1918)
 Gariber Meye (1923)
 Duniya Ar Chaina (1924)
 Meherunnisa (1924)

Essays collections:

 Bilati Barjan Rahasya (1904) 
 Sahitya Prasabga (1904).

References 

1860 births
1923 deaths
People from Sirajganj District
Bengali novelists
Bengali writers
20th-century Indian male writers
Indian male poets
19th-century Bengalis